Ashanti's Christmas is the third studio album and first Christmas album by American singer Ashanti, released on November 18, 2003, by The Inc. Records. The album debuted and peaked at No. 160 on the Billboard 200 and No. 43 on the Top R&B/Hip-Hop Albums chart. The album contained almost an equal number of new songs, written by Ashanti herself, and covers of Christmas classics. As for singles, Ashanti released a Christmas Medley which featured the songs "Christmas Time Again", "The Christmas Song", and "Hey Santa". A video was shot for the medley and it received moderate rotation on BET and MTV. A reworked version of the original song "Time of Year" would later appear on Ashanti's second Christmas album, A Wonderful Christmas with Ashanti.

Track listing

Credits
 Ashanti – vocals
Producers: Irv Gotti, Demi McGhee, Chink Santana
Executive producers: Ashanti Douglas, Irv Gotti
Engineer: Milwaukee Buck
Mixing: Duro, Irv Gotti
Mastering: Tom Coyne
A&R: Chris G.O.T.T.I., Darcell Lawrence, Patrick "Plain Pat" Reynolds, Errol "Eezie" Vaughan Jr.
A&R assistance: Fred Moore, Todd "Shortma" Simms
Recording director: Tony Vanias
Instrumentation: Demi McGhee
Assistant: Terry "Murda Mac" Herbert
Marketing: Daniel Cooper, Deidre Graham
Creative director: Rick Patrick
Art direction: Andy West
Cover photo: Daniela Federici
Inlay photography: Graham Kuhm

Charts

References

2003 Christmas albums
Albums produced by Chink Santana
Albums produced by Irv Gotti
Ashanti (singer) albums
Christmas albums by American artists
Contemporary R&B Christmas albums
Pop Christmas albums